Trouble No More: 50th Anniversary Collection is a compilation album by the Allman Brothers Band.  A retrospective of their entire career, it includes both studio and live tracks, and was recorded from 1969 to 2014.  Comprising five CDs or ten LPs, and packaged as a box set, it was released on February 28, 2020.

The recordings on Trouble No More are arranged in chronological order.  All the performances are by the Allman Brothers Band itself, with all of the 13 different band lineups represented; no material is included from the members' solo projects or their pre-ABB work.  The album contains 61 tracks, of which seven were previously unreleased.  It also includes an illustrated booklet recounting the band's history.

Critical reception 
In Goldmine Ray Chelstowski, wrote "For their 50th anniversary, the Allman Brothers have decided to pull out all of the stops. No stranger to celebrating milestones, the ABB continues to present awe-inspiring collections that marry never heard before material with classics. Moreover, their eye toward building a proper package to house this music has always been razor sharp. In turn with this outing, the extras complement the music in first-rate fashion."

In  AllMusic Thom Jurek said, "[Trouble No More] convincingly formulates the argument that no other American band accomplished more musically (especially live) by seamlessly marrying rock, blues, jazz, and R&B to each other and to extended improvisation.... Sequenced chronologically, the music and its accompanying visuals offer a detailed, rounded portrait of this legendary band at their best in all incarnations."

On jambands.com Larson Sutton said, "Why Trouble No More is essential to those beyond the completist is that, including the neatly inclusive historical essay by the group's chief archivist John Lynskey, it's more than just a bounty of great songs in one place.  This is the goalpost-to-goalpost story of their five decades together – never overwhelming nor too finite – for a sum experience unparalleled in telling their tale."

In Glide Magazine Doug Collette wrote, "Trouble No More is targeted at a demographic less rather than more familiar with the Allman Brothers, music lovers more curious than knowledgeable about its evolution. Yet even as this 50th Anniversary Collection may have only limited appeal to long-time fans, the brilliance of so much of what’s inside is indisputable."  In All About Jazz he wrote, "Thanks no doubt to the mastering expertise of engineer Jason NeSmith, the impeccable audio quality of 50th Anniversary Collection lends a continuity.... In fact, at its best, the audio is as penetrating as the musicianship here..."

Track listing 
The track listing for the CD edition of Trouble No More is:

Personnel 
The Allman Brothers Band

Duane Allman – guitar
Gregg Allman – organ, piano, guitar, vocals
Dickey Betts – guitar, vocals
Berry Oakley – bass
Butch Trucks – drums
Jaimoe – drums
Chuck Leavell – keyboards, vocals
Lamar Williams – bass
Dan Toler – guitar
David "Rook" Goldflies – bass
David "Frankie" Toler – drums
Mike Lawler – keyboards
Warren Haynes – guitar, vocals
Allen Woody – bass, vocals
Johnny Neel – keyboards
Marc Quiñones – congas, percussion, vocals
Jack Pearson – guitar
Oteil Burbridge – bass
Derek Trucks – guitar
Jimmy Herring – guitar

Additional musicians

Tom Doucette – harmonica, percussion on Idlewild South, At Fillmore East
Les Dudek – guitar on "Ramblin' Man", "Jessica"
Jerry Garcia – guitar on "Mountain Jam"
Bob Weir – guitar on "Mountain Jam"
Robbie Robertson – guitar on "Mountain Jam"
Johnny Sandlin – guitar, percussion on Win, Lose or Draw
Bill Stewart – percussion on Win, Lose or Draw
Bonnie Bramlett – vocals on Enlightened Rogues
Joe Lala – percussion on Enlightened Rogues
Jim Essery – harmonica on Enlightened Rogues, Reach for the Sky
Johnny Cobb – piano, vocals on Reach for the Sky
Thomas Caine – vocals on "Hell & High Water"
Jimmy Hall – saxophone on "Never Knew How Much (I Needed You)"

Production

Produced by Bill Levenson, John Lynskey, Kirk West
Executive producer: Bert Holman
Mastering: Jason NeSmith
Essay: John Lynskey
Art direction: Vartan
Design: Josh Graham

References 

The Allman Brothers Band compilation albums
2020 compilation albums